Ako Bisaya (stylized as AKO Bisaya) is a political organization with representation in the House of Representatives of the Philippines.

Background
Ako Bisaya is a political organization established in 2011 and is based in Central Visayas. Its stated constituents in the House of Representatives are the Visayan people. Ako Bisaya aims to facilitate the preservation of the Visayan culture and tradition and provide skills training and financial assistance especially for indigents.

History

18th Congress
It participated in the 2019 elections where it won a single seat for the 18th Congress. The seat was filled in by Sonny Lagon, a native of Mambusao, Capiz who is an engineer and a cockfighter. It received support from various politicians including incumbent President Rodrigo Duterte.

Among Lagon's actions during the 18th Congress include proposing a measure that would recognize January as the Visayan Heritage Month, and a bill mandating cash aid to senior citizens if they reach certain age milestones.

19th Congress
Ako Bisaya will make a bid to retain at least a seat in the House of Representatives and will participate in the 2022 elections. Lagon's wife Daphne will be the group's first nominee while Joannes Alegado, mayor of Consolacion, was named as second nominee.

Representatives to Congress

External links

References

Party-lists represented in the House of Representatives of the Philippines
Political organizations based in the Philippines
Regionalist parties in the Philippines
2011 establishments in the Philippines